Kenyon Hopkins (January 15, 1912 – April 7, 1983) was an American composer who composed many film scores in a jazz idiom.  He was once called "one of jazz's great composers and arrangers."

Biography

Early life and education
Hopkins was born in Coffeyville, Kansas, to the marriage of Rev. Thomas John Hopkins (1871–1939) and Gertrude Conover Nevius (maiden; 1883–aft. July 6, 1967). He, with his parents and brother, Thomas Oliver Hopkins (1915–1973), lived in several towns were his father had been a clergyman who had served as pastor at (i) the First Baptist Church in Coffeyville from 1909 to 1918, (ii) the First Baptist Church in Adrian, Michigan, from 1918 to 1923, (iii) the Tenth Avenue Baptist Church in Columbus, Ohio, from 1923 to 1928, (iv) the Central Baptist Church in Wayne, Pennsylvania, from 1928 to 1936, and (v) the Prospect Hill Baptist Church in Prospect Park, Pennsylvania, from 1936 until his death in 1939.

Hopkins attended Indianola Junior High School in Columbus, then in June 1929, graduated from North High School. In the fall of 1929, he enrolled at Oberlin College where he studied theory and composition.  Hopkins transferred to Temple University, where, in 1933, he earned a degree in music.

Postgraduate influences 
In the mid to late 1940s, after World War II, Hopkins studied theories and the concepts of serial music – including so-called serious music – with Stefan Wolpe.

Career 
In the 1930s, Hopkins arranged in New York for Andre Kostelanetz and Paul Whiteman, and for radio and theater.

Hopkins composed various orchestral works, including two symphonies, the Symphony in Two Movements and Town and County Dances for chamber orchestra, and the jazz ballet Rooms for Anna Sokolow.

He recorded several albums for ABC Paramount Records, Cadence, Capitol, and Verve during the 1960s. Many of his soundtrack recordings were released on LP, including that for the 1956 film Baby Doll, which was re-released on CD.

Personal life and death 
Hopkins married at least three times. He first married, in 1936, vocalist Ramona (née Estrild Raymona Myers, 1909 – 1972). They divorced around June 1943, reportedly in Mexico. On December 13, 1947, he then married a magazine writer and publicist whose first name was Florence. They divorced in 1951 in Dade County, Florida. On February 17, 1952, he married Geri Beitzel (née Geraldine Virginia Beitzel; 1924 – 1995) in Washington Township, Bergen County, New Jersey. She was a soprano and a 1945 graduate of Juilliard.

Hopkins died in Princeton, New Jersey, at the age of 71. He, with his wife Geraldine, had been living on their farm – the Backbone Hill Farm in Clarksburg, New Jersey (near Allentown), for 27 years.

Discography
Contrasting Colors, Capitol, 1959
The Sound of New York, ABC Paramount, [ABC 2269 (mono) / ABCS 2269 (stereo)], recorded November 17, 21, and 27, 1958, in New York; released 1959; conducted by Hopkins (the album included the Geri Beitzel Singers)
"Swinging Serenades", Capitol Records, [T-1236 (mono) / ST-1236 (stereo)], 1959.
Ridin' The Rails, Capitol Records, [T-1302 (mono) / ST-1302 (stereo)], 1960
Nightmare!!, MGM Records [E/SE 4104 (mono) / SE 4104 (stereo)], 1962
The Yellow Canary (Music From The Motion Picture), Kenyon Hopkins and His Orchestra, Verve [V6-8548], recorded April 15 and 16, 1963, in New York; released 1963
The Reporter: The Original Music From the CBS Television Network Series, (Columbia CL 2269 mono), 1964
Sound Tour: France, Verve (in conjunction with Esquire Magazine) (produced by Creed Taylor), 1962

Filmography

Film scores

Television

References

External links

1912 births
1983 deaths
American film score composers
American jazz composers
American male jazz composers
Verve Records artists
20th-century classical composers
20th-century American composers
American male film score composers
20th-century American male musicians
20th-century jazz composers